Unity is a live double album by jazz composer, bandleader and keyboardist Sun Ra and his Arkestra recorded in 1977 and originally released on the Italian Horo label.

Reception
The Allmusic review by Michael G. Nastos awarded the album 4½ stars naming it "The Arkestra's best live album. Loaded with standards. Incredible musicianship".

Track listing
All compositions by Sun Ra except as indicated

Side One:
 "Yesterdays" (Jerome Kern, Otto Harbach) – 5:39  
 "Lightnin'" (Duke Ellington) – 2:37  
 "How Am I To Know?" (Jack King, Dorothy Parker) – 9:33  
 "Lights" – 5:42  
Side Two:   
 "Yeah Man" (Fletcher Henderson) – 3:01  
 "King Porter Stomp" (Jelly Roll Morton) – 4:04  
 "Images" – 10:31  
 "Penthouse Serenade" (Val Burton, Will Jason) – 4:10  
Side Three:
 "Lady Bird/Half Nelson" (Tadd Dameron/Miles Davis) – 8:00  
 "Halloween" – 6:02  
 "My Favorite Things" (Oscar Hammerstein II, Richard Rodgers) – 6:00  
Side Four:   
 "The Satellites" – 7:30  
 "Rose Room" (Art Hickman, Harry Williams) – 9:37  
 "Enlightment" (Hobart Dotson, Sun Ra) – 2:06

Personnel
Sun Ra – organ, Rocksichord 
Ahmed Abdullah, Michael Ray  – trumpet 
Akh Tal Ebah – trumpet, vocals
Craig Harris, Charles Stephens – trombone
Vincent Chancey – French horn
Emmett McDonald – bass horn
Marshall Allen – alto saxophone, oboe, flute
Danny Davis – alto saxophone, flute
John Gilmore – tenor saxophone, clarinet, percussion
Danny Ray Thompson – baritone saxophone, flute
Eloe Omoe – bass clarinet, flute
James Jacson – flute, bassoon, percussion
Richard Williams – bass
Luqman Ali, Thomas Hunter – drums 
Atakatune, Eddie Thomas – percussion
June Tyson – vocals

References 

Sun Ra live albums
Horo Records live albums
1978 live albums